Fowlds Park is a small public reserve in the northern part of Mount Albert, in Auckland City.

History

Previously an asylum endowment, the land was transferred to Mt Albert Domain Board in 1912 in exchange for Council land adjoining the Avondale Mental Hospital. The land was first named Morningside Reserve and used as a garbage tip until the 1930s depression when it was drained by government relief workers and in 1933 renamed Fowlds Park as a tribute to Sir George Fowlds who, as Minister of Health, had arranged the original transfer with the Council land at Avondale.

The Mt Albert Rugby League Club has been using the Fowlds Park grounds since before the Second World War. Other early uses of the Reserve included hockey, tennis and croquet. The Rocky Nook Bowling Club became established in the north-eastern part of the Reserve in the mid 1950s taking over an area previously used as tennis courts and croquet greens.

Description
The park is roughly rectangular in shape and of irregular topography. An extensive stand of mature gum trees line the northern boundary at the park's highest point. There are two main playing fields with a sloping bank between them. The eastern entry to the park is dominated by a memorial gateway dedicated to Sir George Fowlds. To the south and west of the gateway are a grove of mature trees and a landscaped rock outcrop.

Uses and amenities
The park has been used variously by Mt Albert Ramblers Softball Club, Auckland United Softball, Mount Albert Rovers netball club, the Rocky Nook Bowling Club and a Marching Association and Mt Albert Lions Rugby League Club. At the western end of the park, separated from the main sports fields by a stand of poplar trees, is a smaller informal playing field. In this area of the reserve there is also a children's playground and a public coin-operated barbecue.

References
Fowlds Park Management Plan Auckland City April 1992

Urban public parks
Parks in Auckland